Charles Barnes Towns (1862–1947) conducted experimentation with cures for alcoholism and drug addiction, and helped draft drug control legislation in the United States during the early 20th century.

Biography 

Charles B. Towns was born in Georgia in the year 1862 on a small farm. In his youth he worked as a farm hand; he later moved into railroading and eventually sold life insurance at which he was successful. He then moved to New York and between 1901–1904 he had a partnership in a brokerage firm that failed. It was at this time he was approached by a mysterious unnamed individual who claimed that he had a cure for drug addictions such as heroin, opium and alcoholism. The mysterious individual suggested to Towns they could make a lot of money from it.

In spite of Towns' own doctor stating the cure was ridiculous, Towns set out to find addicted people by placing ads for "drug fiends" who wanted to be cured. Towns by this time had read all the known literature on drug addiction and alcoholism. By this trial and error approach Towns refined his cure. Towns' reputation spread in the criminal underworld and he treated addicted gangsters. He involved Dr. Alexander Lambert in his venture. Dr. Lambert was a professor at Cornell University Medical College, who as a physician to President Theodore Roosevelt informed various people in government about the Towns-Lambert cure. Towns was eventually sent by the US government to China to assist with the recovery of some of the 160 million drug addicts in the country. By 1908 while in China, Towns claimed to have cured thousands by his methods. Between the years 1910 and 1920 he aided in the drafting of the Boylan Bill and the Harrison Act.

Towns claimed a 90% success rate from his cure based on the reasoning that those people he never heard from again had been cured. Towns' reputation by the 1920s had greatly diminished in the medical community as his claims regarding his cure became more exaggerated. The Towns-Lambert cure bordered on quackery.

Lambert eventually broke off his association with Towns Hospital. Towns was making claims that his cure was guaranteed to work for any compulsive behavior, from morphinism to nicotinism to caffeinism, to kleptomania and bedwetting. Lambert realized that the percentage of those deemed to be cured needed to be greatly reduced since he had observed that a number of people over the years kept returning for cure after cure. During the 1920s a large part of the hospital revenues was from repeat business.

The Belladonna Cure
The formula  for Towns-Lambert cure was the deliriant, Atropa belladonna, also called deadly nightshade. The effects of belladonna include delirium, hallucinations, light sensitivity, confusion, and dry mouth. The second ingredient in the mixture was another deliriant, Hyoscyamus niger, also known as henbane, hog's bean, or insane root. It contained two alkaloids, hyoscyamine and hyoscine. The third major ingredient was the dried bark or berries of Xanthoxylum americanum, or prickly ash, added to help with diarrhea and intestinal cramps. The dosage given was determined by the physiologic reaction of each patient. When the face became flushed, the throat dry, and the eyes dilated, the amount of the mixture was reduced or stopped.

The mixture was given every hour, day and night, for nearly 50 hours. The end of the treatment was marked by the abundance of stools and then castor oil was given to the patient as a further purgative. 
The treatment was also described as 'puke and purge'.

Every 12 hours the patient was given CC (Compound Cathartic) pills and Blue Mass. These were 19th century medications of varying composition. Blue Mass included mercury, and was prescribed for a cornucopia of ailments.

When a patient was admitted to the hospital while intoxicated or at the end of a spree, the first thing that was done was to put the patient to sleep. The only medication given prior to the hypnotic was the four CC pills. The hypnotic Lambert found best contained chloral hydrate and morphine along with one or two grams of paraldehyde. If the patient went to sleep easily on this hypnotic it was safe to wake him every hour for his belladonna regimen. Dr Lambert believed it was important to administer a small amount of strychnine every four hours.

The week following the treatment a diet of a special tonic and simple and easy to digest meals would relax the patient.

Towns Hospital
Charles B. Towns Hospital was located at 293 Central Park West in Manhattan. Towns started the hospital in 1901, and the roaring twenties and the increase in alcoholism made it successful. However, after the stock market crash of 1929 admissions to the hospital had significantly declined. The hospital aimed at drying out the well-to-do patient. It was an expensive detoxification facility and one was not admitted unless the fee was paid in advance or a backer guaranteed to pay the fee which in those days was $200 to $350 for a five-day stay.

At this time the Chief of Staff was Dr. William Duncan Silkworth. Silkworth had lost all his savings in the market collapse and he had come to Towns to help alcoholics.

Literature
Towns wrote three important books on alcoholism. These were Habits That Handicap in 1915, which was given a review in the New York Times, Reclaiming the Drinker in 1931, and Alcohol and Drug Sickness in 1934.

Influences

Corporations
It was Towns' belief that lack of occupation was the destroyer of men; helping the alcoholic was useless if the man had no job to which he could return. He promoted the idea of educational plans to enlighten people on the hazards of drinking along with the idea that society was to blame for the problem of alcohol hence society needed to take responsibility for those who lost control of their drinking.

It was during the period from 1910 to the 1930s that Towns encouraged corporations and big institutions to help alcoholics while they were still on the job.

Alcoholics Anonymous
Bill Wilson, cofounder of Alcoholics Anonymous (AA), was admitted to Towns Hospital three times between 1933 and 1934. On his third and last stay he showed signs of delirium tremens and was treated with the Belladonna Cure. He thought this would help his alcoholism but he inevitably drank within 3 months of leaving the hospital after "successfully" completing the Belladonna Cure. It was only after meeting a member of the Oxford Group, Ebby Thacher, who is later discussed, and undergoing the Oxford Group's "soul surgery", that he experienced a "white light experience" or a spiritual awakening. After that experience, he never drank again.

Wilson's description of his experience: "All at once I found myself crying out, ‘If there is a God, let Him show himself! I am ready to do anything, anything!’ Suddenly the room lit up with a great white light. I was caught up in an ecstasy which there are no words to describe. It seemed to me in my mind's eye, that I was on a mountain and that a wind not of air but of spirit was blowing. And then it burst upon me that I was a free man. Slowly the ecstasy subsided. I lay there on the bed, but now for a time I was in another world, a new world of consciousness... and I thought to myself, ‘So this is the God of the preachers!’ A great peace stole over me." Earlier that evening, Wilson’s old drinking buddy, Ebby Thacher, a member of the Oxford Group, who had impressed Wilson by going sober with help of spirituality, had visited and tried to persuade Wilson to turn himself over to the care of a Christian deity who would liberate him from alcohol.

Towns was a supporter and creditor of Alcoholics Anonymous, lending Wilson $2500 ($53,000 in 2023 dollar values) to enable him to write what became "The Big Book" of Alcoholics Anonymous. He later told the AA story to a writer who had it published in Liberty which led to the sale of several hundred Big Books. He also offered Wilson, who had been unemployed for several years, a job as a lay therapist, which Wilson declined.

References

Sources
 Alcoholics Anonymous. Pass it On The Story of Bill Wilson and How The A.A. Message Reached the World, New York: Alcoholics Anonymous World Services, Inc., 1984
 Cheevers, Susan. My Name is Bill, Simon & Schuster, 2004
 Pittman, Bill. AA: the Way it Began, Glenn Abbey Books, 1988

External links
 
 
 

1862 births
1947 deaths
Writers from Georgia (U.S. state)
Writers from New York (state)
American health and wellness writers
Alcoholics Anonymous